Rouffignac-Saint-Cernin-de-Reilhac is a commune in the Dordogne department in Nouvelle-Aquitaine in southwestern France.

Geography
Surrounded by rolling hills and agricultural land uses, Rouffignac's nearest communities are the municipalities of Fleurac, St. Geyrac and Saint-Félix-de-Reillac-and-Mortemarts. Montignac is 15 km east.  It is located 25 miles southeast of the city of Périgueux. Two tributaries of the  Vézère, the Manaurie and the Vimont, run close by.

History
The Château de l'Herm nearby dates from the 16th century,  and construction began in the 15th. It was later abandoned, and Eugène Le Roy used it as a setting in his novel Jacquou le Croquant. The church of Saint-Germain-de-Paris is built in a roman style and has a gothic interior. It was classified as a national monument in 1900. A second church is L'église Saint-Saturnin de Saint-Cernin-de-Reillac.
    
On 1 January 1973, the communes of Saint-Cernin-de-Reillac and Rouffignac merged.

The town has few historic buildings as it was destroyed by the Germans in March 1944, the only remaining buildings being the church and the house adjacent. The destruction was caused because two German officers of the Brehmer Division were captured by the French Resistance during World War II. The captives were not harmed but escaped and returned to the town for retribution. No one was killed during the destruction but a rape was reported and many private families had all their possessions stolen by the German army. The destruction became widely known in France and was portrayed as Nazi barbarism.

Rouffignac today
These days the town is an attractive destination. The Rouffignac Cave is an important tourist site, running many miles deep, and served by an electric underground train. It contains prehistoric cave paintings of woolly mammoths and other animals.

Population

See also
Communes of the Dordogne department

References

Communes of Dordogne